Burning Brain Society (BBS) is a non-governmental organisation based in India and United States working on the issues of civil rights and public health. In public health, Tobacco Control is one of the main areas of work for BBS. Headquartered in Chandigarh and Delaware, it was founded in 2001 by Hemant Goswami who is now its chairperson.

References

Organisations based in Chandigarh
Charities based in India
Public health organisations based in India
Charities based in Delaware
2001 establishments in Delaware
2001 establishments in Chandigarh